Mikio Hasemoto (July 13, 1916 – November 29, 1943) was a soldier in United States Army.  He is best known as a recipient of the Medal of Honor in World War II during actions in Cerasuolo, Italy.

Early life
Hasemoto was born at Honolulu, Hawaii.  He is the son of immigrants who were born in Japan. He is a Nisei, which means that he is a second-generation Japanese American.

Soldier
Hasemoto joined the Army from Schofield Barracks, Hawaii in June 1941. Hasemoto volunteered to be part of the all-Nisei 100th Infantry Battalion.  This army unit was mostly made up of Japanese Americans from Hawaii and the mainland.

He was killed while repelling an attack against numerically superior German forces. For his actions in November 1943, he was initially awarded the Distinguished Service Cross.  This was eventually upgraded to the Medal of Honor upon military review on June 21, 2000.

Medal of Honor citation

Private Mikio Hasemoto distinguished himself by extraordinary heroism in action on 29 November 1943, in the vicinity of Cerasuolo, Italy. A force of approximately 40 enemy soldiers, armed with machine guns, machine pistols, rifles, and grenades, attacked the left flank of his platoon. Two enemy soldiers with machine guns advanced forward, firing their weapons. Private Hasemoto, an automatic rifleman, challenged these two machine gunners. After firing four magazines at the approaching enemy, his weapon was shot and damaged. Unhesitatingly, he ran 10 yards to the rear, secured another automatic rifle and continued to fire until his weapon jammed. At this point, Private Hasemoto and his squad leader had killed approximately 20 enemy soldiers. Again, Private Hasemoto ran through a barrage of enemy machine gun fire to pick up an M-1 rifle. Continuing their fire, Private Hasemoto and his squad leader killed 10 more enemy soldiers. With only three enemy soldiers left, he and his squad leader charged courageously forward, killing one, wounding one, and capturing another. The following day, Private Hasemoto continued to repel enemy attacks until he was killed by enemy fire. Private Hasemoto's extraordinary heroism and devotion to duty are in keeping with the highest traditions of military service and reflect great credit on him, his unit, and the United States Army.

See also

List of Medal of Honor recipients
List of Medal of Honor recipients for World War II
442nd Regimental Combat Team

References

External links
 "Army Secretary Lionizes 22 World War II Heroes" at Defense.gov
 

United States Army personnel killed in World War II
United States Army Medal of Honor recipients
American military personnel of Japanese descent
1916 births
1943 deaths
People from Honolulu
Recipients of the Distinguished Service Cross (United States)
World War II recipients of the Medal of Honor
Burials in the National Memorial Cemetery of the Pacific